Swifty may refer to:

 Swifty Lazar (1907–1993), American talent agent and deal-maker
 Swifty McVay (born 1974), American rapper and member of D12
 Swifty, one of the two protagonists of the 2013 film The Selfish Giant
 Swifty The Space Bird, a main character in the anime The Adventures of the Little Prince
 Swifty Chase, the protagonist of the short-lived comic My Date Comics (1947-1948)
 Swiftie or Swifty, nickname for fans of singer Taylor Swift
 Swifty (film), a 1935 Western film directed by Alan James

See also
 Tom Swifty, a type of pun